William R. Hough is an American investment banker known for being a benefactor of the University of Florida.

Hough received his Master of Business Administration from the University of Florida (UF) in 1948. Hough was a member of Delta-Delta chapter of the Kappa Sigma fraternity. Hough is the founder of William R. Hough and Company of St. Petersburg, Florida.  He gave $30 million to the graduate business programs at the Warrington College of Business at UF.

References

Warrington College of Business alumni
Living people
Year of birth missing (living people)